Ayaka Komatsu ( Komatsu Ayaka; born 23 July 1986) is a Japanese model, gravure idol and actress. She was born in Ichinoseki, Iwate Prefecture.

Biography

Modeling career
Her modeling agency is Amuse inc. She was a regular model of the now defunct Candy magazine. She also appeared in the Winter 2002-2003 "Angel Blue" fashion catalog and was on the cover of the manga Young Sunday dated April 7, 2005.

She was a member of the 2004 edition of the Japanese modeling quartet named Nittelligenic, an idol group sponsored by Nippon TV.

Acting career
She has acted in the following movies: Odoru Daisosasen The Movie 2 (her role in this film was relatively minor; she gets attacked by a vampire), Koibumi, Master of Thunder, A Perfect Day for Love Letters, Drift and Drift 2 (later released as Drift Deluxe Edition), and Boku wa Imōto ni Koi o Suru (which opened in Japan on January 20, 2007, and later in Europe under the English title My Sister, My Love).

Arguably, her best known role was as Minako Aino/Sailor V/Sailor Venus in the series Pretty Guardian Sailor Moon.

Komatsu was in the cast of a TV show called Dandori Musume ("Appointment Girls"). Her role in Dandori Musume is more comic than tragic, in contrast to her PGSM role. In 2008, she appeared in Average and in episode 7 of Aren't You a Criminal?.

She had a recurring role in the summer Fuji TV drama Buzzer Beat, reuniting with her former Sailor Moon cast member Keiko Kitagawa, who had the lead female role as well as with Yamashita Tomohisa as Komatsu made a cameo appearance on his previous drama, Kurosagi.

Filmography

TV shows

TV drama

Movies

Stage

Publications

Discography

Singles
2003: C'est la vie 〜 Watashi no naka no koi suru bubun (C'est la Vie～私の中の恋する部分: C'est la Vie ~ the Loving Part within Me)
2003: Katagoshi ni Kinsei (肩越しに金星: Venus Over Your Shoulder)
2004: Romance
2004: Kiss!² Bang!²
2004: Sayonara ~ Sweet Days (さよなら～Sweet Days: Goodbye ~ Sweet Days)
2008: Happy time, Happy life

Albums
2003: I'll Be Here (under title Aino Minako)

Other Albums as Aino Minako
Kirari ☆ Sailor Dream! C / w C'est la vie (11, 2003, Columbia Music Entertainment)
(February 2004, same as above) Sailor Moon DJ Moon
(February 2004, same as above) pack Sailor Moon Koro-chan
(March 2004, same as above) Sailor Moon Character Song Sailor Venus Minako Aino
(May 2004, same as above) pack Sailor Moon 2 Koro-chan
(May 2004, same as above) Sailor Moon DJ Moon 2
(June 2004, same as above) Sailor Moon Dear My Friend
(July 2004, same as above) Sailor Moon DJ Moon 3
(July 2004, same as above) pack Sailor Moon 3 Koro-chan
Three pieces, including a mini-album (September 2004, same as above) Sailor Moon Moon Light Real Girl of Aino Minako
Sailor Moon Song Collection (November 2004, same as above)

Idol DVDs
2004: Figure A Nittelegenic 2004 Komatsu Ayaka
2005: Megami no Chu! Nittelegenic 2004 Komatsu Ayaka
2005: Masaka… Komatsu Ayaka
2007: Sho o Suteyo, Mizugi ni Naro!
2007: Dream Note
2007: Happy ending: Dream Note II
2009: AYAKA
2009: Ayaka×Komatsu Ayaka
2011: Ayakafuru
2012: Hawaaaaaaaaaaii

Idol photobooks
2004: Ayaka no natsu 
2004: Nitchoku -  Nittelegenic Official Photos 
2005: Summer Date 
2006: Moon Doll 
2007: Cheeeeeez 
2009: AYAKA×killer Virgin Road 
2011: Ayaka no zenbu 
2012: Komagokochi  
2019: KOMAPHOTO [fantasy]
2019: KOMAPHOTO [real]

References

External links
 Agency profile 
 

Japanese film actresses
Japanese television actresses
Japanese gravure models
1986 births
Living people
People from Ichinoseki, Iwate
Japanese women pop singers
Japanese female models
Japanese television personalities
Musicians from Iwate Prefecture
21st-century Japanese actresses
21st-century Japanese women singers
21st-century Japanese singers
Amuse Inc. talents